Bhutan Cricket Council Board is the official governing body of the sport of cricket in Bhutan. Its current headquarters is in Thimpu, Bhutan. Bhutan Cricket Council Board is Bhutan's representative at the International Cricket Council and is an affiliate member and has been a member of that body since 2001. It is also a member of the Asian Cricket Council.In 2017, became an associate member

References

External links
Official site of Bhutan Cricket Council Board

Cricket administration
Cricket
Sports organizations established in 2001